Mankono Department is a department of Béré Region in Woroba District, Ivory Coast. In 2021, its population was 271,894 and its seat is the settlement of Mankono. The sub-prefectures of the department are Bouandougou, Mankono, Marandallah, Sarhala, and Tiéningboué.

History

Mankono Department was created in 1980 as a first-level subdivision via a split-off from Séguéla Department. Using current boundaries as a reference, from 1980 to 2005 the department occupied the same territory as Béré Region.

In 1997, regions were introduced as new first-level subdivisions of Ivory Coast; as a result, all departments were converted into second-level subdivisions. Mankono Department was included in Worodougou Region.

In 2005, Mankono Department was divided to create Kounahiri Department.

In 2011, districts were introduced as new first-level subdivisions of Ivory Coast. At the same time, regions were reorganised and became second-level subdivisions and all departments were converted into third-level subdivisions. At this time, Mankono Department became part of Béré Region in Woroba District.

In 2012, Mankono Department was divided again when two sub-prefectures were split-off to form Dianra Department.

Notes

Departments of Béré Region
1980 establishments in Ivory Coast
States and territories established in 1980